The canton of Chalosse Tursan is an administrative division of the Landes department, southwestern France. It was created at the French canton reorganisation which came into effect in March 2015. Its seat is in Hagetmau.

It consists of the following communes:
 
Arboucave
Aubagnan
Audignon
Aurice
Banos
Bas-Mauco
Bats
Castelnau-Tursan
Castelner
Cauna
Cazalis
Clèdes
Coudures
Dumes
Eyres-Moncube
Fargues
Geaune
Hagetmau
Haut-Mauco
Horsarrieu
Labastide-Chalosse
Lacajunte
Lacrabe
Lauret
Mant
Mauries
Miramont-Sensacq
Momuy
Monget
Monségur
Montaut
Montgaillard
Montsoué
Morganx
Payros-Cazautets
Pécorade
Peyre
Philondenx
Pimbo
Poudenx
Puyol-Cazalet
Saint-Cricq-Chalosse
Sainte-Colombe
Saint-Sever
Samadet
Sarraziet
Serres-Gaston
Serreslous-et-Arribans
Sorbets
Urgons

References

Cantons of Landes (department)